Frazer is a census-designated place (CDP) in East Whiteland Township in Chester County, Pennsylvania, United States. It is located along US 30 between Exton and Malvern, and is the northern terminus for Pennsylvania Route 352. The Philadelphia Main Line runs through the community, and SEPTA has a regional rail maintenance yard along the line.

Demographics

As of the 2020 census, there were 3,635 people living in Frazer. The racial makeup of the CDP was 62.2% White, 2.3% African-American, 0.7% Native American, 24.7% Asian, 4.3% from some other race, and 5.8% from two or more races.

Notable people
 Erma Keyes (1926–1999), All-American Girls Professional Baseball League player; born in Frazer and graduated from Ursinus College.
Jack Lapp, a Major League Baseball catcher from 1908-1916 who played for the 1911 World Series champion Philadelphia Athletics, was born in Frazer.
This is also the town where singer-songwriter Jim Croce is buried.

References

Census-designated places in Pennsylvania
Census-designated places in Chester County, Pennsylvania